Witty is a surname. Notable people with the name include:

 Andrew Witty (born 1964), English chief executive officer and university chancellor
 Arthur Witty (1878–1969), Spanish footballer, club president and businessman
 Chris Witty (born 1975), American speed skater and racing cyclist
 George Witty (1856–1941), New Zealand Member of Parliament for Riccarton
 John Witty (1915–1990), British film and television actor

See also
 Featherstone-Witty
 Whitty